Čitluk is a village near Sinj, Split-Dalmatia County, Croatia.

History

In 42, the colony of Aequum was founded by Emperor Claudius, perhaps sparked by an attempted revolt of the governor of Dalmatia, Lucius Arruntius Camillus Scribonianus.

References

External links
 Illyria or Liburnia and Dalmatia - Fifth Map of Europe 

Populated places in Split-Dalmatia County